Peng Zhao is a Chinese-American businessman who is the CEO of Citadel Securities. Peng Zhao was born in Beijing, China.

Education
Zhao was a student of the Talented Children Training Program at Beijing No.8 High School from 1993 to 1997, and attended Peking University and earned a bachelor's degree in applied mathematics in 2001. In 2006, he obtained his PhD degree in statistics from University of California, Berkeley.

Career
Peng Zhao was a summer associate at Lehman Brothers and served as a quantitative researcher at Evnine & Associates prior to joining Citadel. 

Peng Zhao joined Citadel Securities in 2006 as a quantitative researcher.

In July 2016, Citadel Securities announced that then Microsoft COO, B. Kevin Turner, was joining the firm as CEO. At this time a new role, chief scientist, was created specifically for Peng Zhao who was then global head of market making. Five months after joining, Kevin Turner left Citadel Securities, and on January 27, 2017, at age 34, Peng Zhao was promoted to CEO. 

In 2019, Zhao was named on Fortune's 40 Under 40 list.

Philanthropy 
Zhao and his wife organized a 1 million surgical mask donation to Chicago's first responders during the coronavirus pandemic in 2020. :The couple also supports Kartemquin Films, a non-profit documentary filmmaking organization, in its efforts to fund filmmakers from the AAPI community through the Peng Zhao and Cherry Chen Fund for AAPI Voices. The couple were co-executive producers of the award-winning documentary "Finding Yingying", which was released by Kartemquin Films.  Zhao and Chen also fund the Victor Wong Fellowship, a program associated with Chicago's Second City, to train and mentor aspiring comedians from the AAPI community.   Peng and other founding board members of TAAF committed $125 million to support AAPI organizations and causes at launch. According to The New York Times, it was the single largest philanthropic gift devoted to Asian Americans.

References

External links
 Citadel LLC home page
 Citadel Securities home page

Businesspeople from Beijing
Chinese hedge fund managers
Chinese chief executives
Peking University alumni
UC Berkeley College of Letters and Science alumni
1983 births
Living people
21st-century Chinese businesspeople